Rune Andersson may refer to:
Rune Andersson (rower) (1930–2006), Swedish rower
Rune Andersson (sport shooter) (1919–1992), Swedish sports shooter
Rune Johan Andersson (born 1945), Norwegian cartoonist, illustrator and children's writer